RAAF Base Pearce  is the main Royal Australian Air Force (RAAF) military air base in Western Australia, located in Bullsbrook, north of Perth. It is used for training by the RAAF and the Republic of Singapore Air Force.

Pearce is the busiest RAAF base in Australia, with the highest air traffic including civil flights, including civil movements at the Joint User bases. Although its primary role is pilot training, it remains the only permanent RAAF base on the west coast, and thus has a significant logistics role. Pearce also has operational responsibility for RAAF Gingin, a small military airfield located near Pearce, also used for flying training. When requested by the flying units, a rotation of air traffic controllers travel from Pearce to Gingin daily to provide services.

History
Built between 1936 and 1939, RAAF Base Pearce was officially granted "station" status on 6 February 1939. It was named in honour of Sir George Pearce, a Senator from Western Australia. Pearce was elected to the inaugural Senate in 1901 and remained a Senator for Western Australia until 1938. He was Minister for Defence in four separate ministries including the period 1910 to 1913 when the Central Flying School was established.

The base opened with two resident squadrons, Nos. 14 and 25 Squadrons. During World War II, No. 5 Initial Training School (ITS) was formed at RAAF Pearce as part of the Empire Air Training Scheme and No. 85 Squadron RAAF was stationed. Recruits commenced their military service at the ITS, learning fundamentals such as mathematics, navigation and aerodynamics.

On 10 September 1950 a one-off motor race meeting, called the "Air Force Handicap" was held as a part of an air show. The circuit was triangular in shape, and used all three runways of the base. The feature race was won on handicap by Syd Negus in a Plymouth Special, ahead of Syd Barker in a Ballot V8 and Arthur Collett in an MG TC.

In 1964, Australia and the United States agreed to conduct a "Joint Research Program for Studying Aero-Space Disturbances and their Effect on Radio Communications" at the Pearce base.

RAAF Base Pearce is used by the Australian Air Force Cadets as a headquarters and for promotional courses, as well as serving as headquarters for No. 7 Wing and premises for No. 701 Squadron (AAFC).

The base also serves as an anti-hijacking training aid for Special Air Service Regiment counter-terrorism squadron, also known as Tactical Assault Group (West). It is used to practise airliner entry and hostage rescue drills. The base is home to a mockup of a Boeing 747 used for this counter-terrorism training.  Built in the early 1990s the mockup is slightly smaller than the Boeing 747, includes two non-operational engines and has been painted in the livery of the fictional Emu Airlines.

Since 1993, Republic of Singapore Air Force (RSAF) has operated its Flying Training Institute at Pearce. As part of the institute, No. 130 Squadron RSAF operates training aircraft at Pearce.

The 2005 Defence Force Air Show, held at Pearce on 19–20 November, marked the first visit to Perth of the United States Air Force (USAF) B-1B Lancer bomber. The 2012 Defence Force Air Show, held at Pearce on 19–20 May, included visits by a USAF B-52 bomber, a USAF KC-135 tanker, an RAAF AEW&C Wedgetail and an RSAF C-130 Hercules.

In 2014, the base was the hub for the international search of the southern Indian Ocean for Malaysia Airlines Flight 370. It hosted search aircraft from six other nations including a United States Navy P-8 Poseidon, P-3 Orions of the Royal New Zealand Air Force, Japanese Maritime Self-Defense Force and Republic of Korea Navy, and Ilyushin Il-76s of the Chinese People's Liberation Army Air Force.

Pearce has sometimes been proposed as the site for a second Perth international airport.

RAAF units
The following units are located at RAAF Base Pearce:

Gallery

See also
 List of airports in Western Australia
 List of Royal Australian Air Force installations

References

External links

RAAF Base Pearce at airforce.gov.au
 Air Force PC-21

Royal Australian Air Force bases
Airports in Western Australia
Military airbases established in 1939
1939 establishments in Australia
Military installations in Western Australia
Australia
Western Australia during World War II
20th-century architecture in Australia